The Estonian Provincial Assembly or Estonian State Diet, also often called by its Estonian name Maapäev, was elected in May–June 1917 during the Russian Revolution as the provincial parliament (diet) of the Autonomous Governorate of Estonia.
On 28 November 1917, after the Bolshevik coup in Russia, the Assembly declared itself the sole sovereign power in Estonia and called for the elections of the Estonian Constituent Assembly. On the eve of the German occupation of Estonia in World War I the council elected the Estonian Salvation Committee and issued the Estonian Declaration of Independence on 24 February 1918.

History

On 12 April 1917 the Russian Provisional Government issued an order on the provisional autonomy of Estonia. The Governorate of Estonia (now northern Estonia) was merged with Estonian-speaking northern part of the Governorate of Livonia (now southern Estonia), to form the autonomous governorate. The Russian Provisional Government decreed that the provincial assembly be created with members elected by indirect universal suffrage.

Elections for the 62 deputies of the Maapäev were held in many stages; members representing the rural communities were elected in two-tiered elections in May–June, while the town representatives were elected in July–August, 1917. The election process saw the creation and reorganization of Estonian national parties.

Six parties were represented at the diet, with three independent deputies and two deputies representing the Baltic German and Swedish-Estonian minorities.

Results

Aftermath 
In the wake of the November 1917 Bolshevik coup in Petrograd (Saint Petersburg), when the Bolshevik "Estonian Military Revolutionary Committee" staged a similar coup in the Estonian capital Reval (Tallinn), the Maapäev refused to recognize the new Bolshevik rule. The Bolsheviks then attempted to disband the council. In its last meeting on 15 November 1917, the Maapäev proclaimed itself the supreme legal authority of Estonia until the convening of the Constituent Assembly. The Committee of Elders was authorized to issue laws. The council was then dissolved by force on 26 November by the Bolsheviks, compelling leading politicians to go underground. In the Constituent Assembly elections in early 1918, which were organised by the Bolsheviks, two-thirds of the voters supported the parties who stood for national statehood. The Bolsheviks then immediately proclaimed the elections null and void. On 19 February 1918, the Committee of Elders of the Land Council decided to proclaim Estonian independence. A Salvation Committee (a three-member committee formed by the Maapäev as executive body for the time when the activities of the Assembly were hindered) with special powers was set up for that purpose. On 24 February, after the Bolsheviks abandoned Tallinn and one day before German forces occupied the country's capital city, the Salvation Committee issued a formal declaration of independence of the Republic of Estonia.

After the German occupation of Estonia ended, the Maapäev continued as the legislature of Estonia until 1919.

See also
Autonomous Governorate of Estonia
Salvation Committee
History of Estonia
List of Chairmen of the Estonian Provincial Assembly
Estonian War of Independence
Treaty of Tartu (Russian–Estonian)

Notes

References

External links
Tartu rahu sepistaja Jaan Poska väärib monumenti 
Livland. Estland. Kurland. Œsel.
On 28 November 1917, the Estonian Diet (the Maapäev) declared itself fee supreme power in Estonia.
On 28 November 1917, the Land council proclaimed itself the highest power in Estonia...
On This Day – 28 November 1917
Though the popularly elected Provisional National Council, had proclaimed itself the highest authority in Estonia as early as 28 November 1917...

Elections in Estonia
Estonian Provincial Assembly election
Independence of Estonia
Defunct unicameral legislatures
1917 establishments in Estonia
1919 disestablishments
Estonian Provincial Assembly election
Estonian Provincial Assembly election
Estonian Provincial Assembly election
Estonian Provincial Assembly election